The Fifty-Three were a group of 53 Iranians arrested for involvement in communist political activities in 1937 and brought to trial in November 1938 in the most sensational of the political trials held during the reign of Reza Shah Pahlavi. Some, such as Dr. Taqi Arani, died in jail - the rest were released in 1941.

As a result of the similarity with the prosecution of the Old Bolsheviks in the Stalinist show trials in the Soviet Union in 1936–1938, some jested that Rezā Shāh was performing an imitation of Joseph Stalin.

The fifty-five were:

 1. Taqi Arani
 2. Abdul-Samad Kambakhsh
 3. Mohammad Bahrami
 4. Mohammad Shureshyan
 5. Ali Sadeqpour
 6. Mohammad Boqrati
 7. Ziya Alamutti
 8. Mohammad Pazhuh
 9. Mohammad Farjami
 10. Abbas Azeri
 11. Nasratallah Ezazi
 12. Anvar Khamei
 13.  Nosrat-ollah Jahanshahlou
 14. Emad Alamutti
 15. Akbar Ashfar
 16. Taqi Makinezhad
 17. Mojtaba Sajjadi
 18. Bozorg Alavi
 19. Mehdi Rasai
 20. Iraj Eskandari
 21. Morteza Yazdi
 22. Reza Radmanesh
 23. Khalil Maleki
 24. Morteza Sajjadi
 25. Hossein sajjadi
 26. Ali Shandramini
 27. Mohammad Qodreh
 28. Taqi Shahin
 29. Morteza Razavi
 30. Seyfollah Sayyah
 31. Alinqali Hokmi
 32. Ezatollah Etiqechi
 33. Vali Khajavi
 34. Rahim Alamutti
 35. Shayban Zamani
 36. Abdul-Qassem Ashtari
 37. Hossein Tarbiyat
 38. Fazollah Garkani
 39. Yousef Soqfi
 40. Jalal Naini
 41. Rajbali Nasimi
 42. Bahman Shomali
 43. Mehdi Laleh
 44. Ehsan Tabari
 45. Abbas Naraqi
 46. Mehdi Daneshvar
 47. Hassan Habibi
 48. Nuraldin Alamutti
 49. Reza Ibrahimzadeh
 50. Khalel Enqelab
 51. Fereydun Manou
 52. Ana Turkoman
 53. Razi Hakim-Allahi
 54. Mohammad Ebrahim Moghadam
 55. Ahmad Mohammad-pour Nikbin

Footnotes

References
 

1937 in Iran
1938 in Iran
Communism in Iran
 
Iranian prisoners and detainees
Political repression in Iran
Political and cultural purges
Prisoners and detainees of Iran